Altan may refer to:

 Altan (name)
 Altan (band), a folk music group from Donegal
 Altan (album), a 1987 album by Mairéad Ní Mhaonaigh and Frankie Kennedy
 Altan Jalab, a village in Afghanistan
 Altan (river), stretch of the lower course of the Kuranakh-Yuryakh river, Yakutia, Russia

See also 
 Atlan (disambiguation)